John Bunch Plays Kurt Weill is a solo piano album by John Bunch. It was recorded in 1975 and issued by the Chiaroscuro imprint. When it was issued on CD, tracks recorded in 1991 were added.

Recording and music
The album of solo piano performances by Bunch was recorded in May 1975. All twelve pieces were composed by Kurt Weill. Bunch plays them in a variety of ways: "some at ballad tempo, others with a flavour of stride, some delivered with Monk-like rhythms".

Releases and reception

John Bunch Plays Kurt Weill was released by Chiaroscuro Records. Its CD reissue added a further five Weill compositions that Bunch recorded in 1991.

The Penguin Guide to Jazz described the album as "a rare and strikingly imaginative project". The AllMusic reviewer wrote that it was "one of John Bunch's finest recordings from a long career".

Track listing

Original album
"Alabama Song"
"Surabaya Johnny"
"My Ship"
"September Song"
"Oh Heart of Love"
"This Is New"
"Westwind"
"Lost in the Stars"
"No Place to Go but Up"
"Le Roi d'Aquitaine"
"Johnny's Song"
"Speak Low"

CD release
Five tracks were added to the original twelve:

"It Never Was You"
"There'll Be Life, Love & Laughter"
"Here I'll Stay"
"What Good Would the Moon Be"
"Moon-Faced, Starry-Eyed"

Personnel
John Bunch – piano

References

Kurt Weill tribute albums
Solo piano jazz albums
Chiaroscuro Records albums